Stefan Dziedzic (15 October 1927 – 30 July 2006) was a Polish skier. He competed at the 1948 Winter Olympics and the 1952 Winter Olympics.

References

1927 births
2006 deaths
Polish male alpine skiers
Polish male cross-country skiers
Polish male Nordic combined skiers
Olympic alpine skiers of Poland
Olympic cross-country skiers of Poland
Olympic Nordic combined skiers of Poland
Alpine skiers at the 1952 Winter Olympics
Cross-country skiers at the 1948 Winter Olympics
Nordic combined skiers at the 1948 Winter Olympics
Sportspeople from Zakopane
20th-century Polish people